Dom Sorkh Laki may refer to:

 Sorkh Dom-e Khushnamvand
 Sorkh Dom-e Laki